Louisiana's 22nd State Senate district is one of 39 districts in the Louisiana State Senate. It has been represented by Republican Fred Mills since 2011.

Geography
District 22 covers parts of Iberia, Lafayette, St. Landry, and St. Martin Parishes to the east of the city of Lafayette, including some or all of New Iberia, St. Martinville, Breaux Bridge, Port Barre, and Broussard.

The district overlaps with Louisiana's 3rd and 5th congressional districts, and with 38th, 46th, 48th, 49th, and 96th districts of the Louisiana House of Representatives.

Recent election results
Louisiana uses a jungle primary system. If no candidate receives 50% in the first round of voting, when all candidates appear on the same ballot regardless of party, the top-two finishers advance to a runoff election.

2019

2015

2011

Federal and statewide results in District 22

References

Louisiana State Senate districts
Iberia Parish, Louisiana
Lafayette Parish, Louisiana
St. Landry Parish, Louisiana
St. Martin Parish, Louisiana